Qendër Dukas is a former municipality in the Fier County, southwestern Albania. At the 2015 local government reform it became a subdivision of the municipality Mallakastër. The population at the 2011 census was 6,253.

References

Former municipalities in Fier County
Administrative units of Mallakastër